Hileithia sparsalis is a moth in the family Crambidae. It was described by Harrison Gray Dyar Jr. in 1914. It is found in Panama.

The wingspan is about 12 mm. The wings are straw yellow tinged with small costal dots on the forewings. There is a dark shade along the margins of both wings.

References

Moths described in 1914
Spilomelinae